Vivian Smith is the name of:

Vivian Smith (chess player) (born 1951)
Ian Smith (South African cricketer) (Vivian Ian Smith, 1925–2015), South African test cricketer
Vivian Smith (poet) (born 1933), Australian poet
Vivian Smith, 1st Baron Bicester (1867–1956)
Vivian L. Smith Elementary
Viv Smith, character in Specials
Vivienne Smith (swimmer) (born 1952), Irish Olympic swimmer
Vivian Smith (suffragist), American civil rights activist and women's suffragist